This is a List of Australian inquiries and reports relating to uranium mining issues.

Background
For several decades uranium mining has been a major part of the Australian political landscape, with opposition groups citing the wide-ranging environmental impacts, indigenous land access and nuclear proliferation as reasons for ceasing or restricting the industry.  The debate has resulted in limitations on mining and export activities, with Federal and State governments occasionally flip-flopping on public policy.  In the meantime, mining companies have pursued exploration activities, and in some instances stockpiled mined ore.

List
1976: Ranger Uranium Environmental Inquiry (Fox Report) (Vol 1) - Ranger Uranium Environmental Inquiry - Whether Australia should mine and export uranium
1977: Fox Report (Vol 2) - Ranger Uranium Environmental Inquiry - Proposed Development of Ranger 
1984-1985: McClelland Royal Commission or Royal Commission into British nuclear tests in Australia.
1986: Ranger Uranium: Water Management System - House of Representatives inquiry 
1988: The Potential of the Kakadu National Park Region - Senate Standing Committee on Environment, Recreation and the Arts
1991: Mining and Minerals Processing in Australia (4 Vols) – Industry Commission
1991: Kakadu Conservation Zone Inquiry Final Report – Resources Assessment Commission
1996: Report of the Senate Select Committee on Radioactive Waste. In response to this the Senate decided to reconstitute the committee as the Select Committee on Uranium Mining and Milling.
1996: Senate Select Committee established to report on Uranium Mining and Milling
1997: Senate Select Committee on Uranium Mining and Milling released report
1999: Australia's Kakadu – Government response to UNESCO World Heritage Committee regarding Kakadu National Park.
1999: Senate Inquiry into Jabiluka Uranium Mine Project referred to ECITA Committee
1999: Report of ECITA Committee into Jabiluka Uranium Mine Project released
2002: Senate Inquiry into Environmental Regulation of Uranium Mining
2006: Greenhouse friendly fuel for an energy hungry world  - House of Representatives Standing Committee on Industry and Resources
2016: Nuclear Fuel Cycle Royal Commission

See also
Anti-nuclear movement in Australia
Australian Uranium Association
Uranium mining in Australia

References

Political history of Australia
Uranium mining in Australia
Nuclear technology-related lists
Uranium mining
Books about indigenous rights
Uranium politics
History of mining in Australia
Uranium mining